Kaymasha (Qaymaşa) is a rural locality (a village) in Itkineyevsky Selsoviet, Yanaulsky District, Bashkortostan, Russia. The population was 224 as of 2010. There are two streets.

Geography 
Kaymasha is located 13 km southeast of Yanaul (the district's administrative centre) by road. Kaymashbash is the nearest rural locality.

References 

Rural localities in Yanaulsky District